CAJ may refer to:

Canaima Airport, Venezuela, IATA code
Canon, Inc., NYSE symbol
Air Caraïbes Atlantique, ICAO airline designator
Canadian Alpine Journal
Canadian Association of Journalists
Christian Academy in Japan
Committee on the Administration of Justice

Caglio, Lombardy, Italy, local name Caj